Libra is a supervillain appearing in comic books published by DC Comics. He first appeared in Justice League of America #111 (May–June 1974), where he formed the first incarnation of the Injustice Gang (though there had been other villain groups with similar names, like the Injustice Society and the Injustice League). Libra made his return with a leading role in Final Crisis in 2008.

Publication history
Libra's only major appearance, prior to his appearance in Final Crisis, was in Justice League of America #111–112, in 1974. In 2004, he made a brief cameo in the JLA/Avengers crossover (#4) by Kurt Busiek and George Pérez.

Grant Morrison, the writer of Final Crisis, explained the reason for picking an obscure villain:

The reason I chose them was because Libra came from my favorite ever run of  'Justice League of America' and he's never been used again. He was a character who had stolen all the powers of the Justice League, but then couldn't handle it and ascended to some kind of screaming godhood where he became a million transparent body parts spread across the sky. So I thought if I was doing a thing about the New Gods, he'd be an interesting guy to bring back because I needed a masked mystery man to start a new recruitment drive for the Secret Society of Supervillains (sic), because they become almost a terrorist sect. Under Libra's guidance, they start doing quite bad things, even to superheroes' wives and families, crossing the line. So there's that element to the story and I needed a masked guy, who people didn't really know that well. And I remembered Libra and the fact that he is connected to this ascending to godhood thing tied him in really quite nicely. What's really going on under the hood will be revealed later in the series.

In May 2008, his appearances were reprinted in DC Universe Special: Justice League of America at the same time as he was reintroduced, along with the Human Flame (a Martian Manhunter foe who appeared in Detective Comics #274), in Justice League of America #21. He returns, apparently retaining the full might of his godlike status, to lead a new and final incarnation of the Secret Society of Super-Villains, this time offering to every villain, from simple costumed crooks to major ones, the realization of his/her fondest wish.

The full origins of Libra and the connection between his original appearance and Final Crisis was then made apparent in a one-shot story by his original creator, Len Wein, in Final Crisis: Secret Files #1 in December 2008.

Fictional character biography
In Final Crisis: Secret Files #1, it was shown that Libra was born Justin Ballantine, who lost his mother at the age of eight due to an alcoholic pharmacist mismeasuring medicine his mother needed. Soon after his father turned to alcoholism himself and brutally abused Justin regularly. Justin would later use all the money he had to buy a telescope so that he could stargaze and imagine a better life among the stars. His father threatened to beat him with his telescope one night but he lost his balance and fell to his death, which led Justin to see the importance of balance in the universe. While attending university, his physics professor was Ted Knight (Starman).

Libra was a secret founder of the group of super-villains named Injustice Gang, given control by a mysterious benefactor. He constructed an unusual device, the Transmortifier, basing it on copied plans of Ted Knight's Cosmic Rod. The device enabled him to steal half the powers or energies of a given person. By the end of the first appearance, it was revealed that their entire operation was a massive feint by their organizer, Libra, to test the Transmortifier. A series of "Plan A" devices the villains had been given in case the JLA defeated them absorbed half of the heroes' powers and transferred them to Libra. Satisfied with these results, he then turned his device upon the universe itself, hoping to become a god. Instead, Libra was absorbed into the universe itself, effectively disintegrating him and spreading his essence across the cosmos. He spent years drifting through the cosmos, until he was brought back to cohesion on Apokolips, by Desaad. There he encounters his initial benefactor, Glorious Godfrey, and his master, Darkseid. He promises eternal loyalty to Darkseid. Morrison has implied that this means Libra has become a New God.

Libra returns in Final Crisis controlling an army of super-villains and threatening the entire Multiverse. He is identified in Justice League of America #21 as an alien warlord, although no such origin was indicated in his initial appearance, or subsequently in Final Crisis: Secret Files #1. During the events of Final Crisis #1 he kills the Martian Manhunter with his staff, granting the Human Flame's greatest desire. Before he died, the Martian Manhunter revealed that he knew how this would end. He told Libra he and his kind would fail, that they always fail. He also told Libra that defeat was his destiny, now and forever. To prove his claims to Lex Luthor when he requests to draw Superman to him, Libra then sends Clayface I to bomb the Daily Planet Building, severely injuring Lois Lane. Later, when the Human Flame thanks Libra for his revenge, Libra begins to discuss what the villain owes him. In follow-up to this, Libra gives him a new base at the former swamp headquarters of the Legion of Doom and then gives him a new upgraded outfit. When Libra shoves a helmet (which turns out to be a Justifier helmet) on Human Flame, he is transformed into a mindless slave to the Anti-Life Equation. Libra then reveals himself as a prophet of Darkseid.

At this point, Lex Luthor tries to kill Libra, having concluded that Libra's effectiveness makes him too dangerous to be left alive, but the newer villain instead surrounds him with more Justifiers. He offers Luthor a choice to either swear an oath to the God of Evil (Darkseid) or become a mindless slave. At the time Libra is leading the Secret Society of Super-Villains at a public execution. Some savant with access to the Society's computers has been breaking codes for the Resistance, and Libra has condemned Calculator for the action. Lex Luthor is silent on the matter, but has been picked to lead the rearguard action against the heroes at Blüdhaven. He assumes it is an honor, but he does not look very pleased. A hole in the sky opens over the hanging, and as Libra tells the Society of the "night of anguish that lasts forever", Darkseid gains the fullness of his power. Libra, having discovered, at this time, that Lex Luthor was the actual mole, attempts to kill him only to have Doctor Sivana use a device to disable the Justifiers. Luthor blasts Libra, seemingly killing him. Lex Luthor reveals that Libra was a living embodiment of the Anti-Life Equation.

In Final Crisis: Rogues' Revenge, Libra is shocked when he hears that the Rogues declined membership into his Secret Society. Many times and in many ways he attempts to recruit them, including threats against their families and revealing that Barry Allen had returned from the dead, but failed. As they walk away, Libra shouts that evil will win.

In Final Crisis: Revelations, Libra is confronted by Crispus Allen, the third Spectre, who has come to judge him for the murder of the Martian Manhunter. Not only was the Spectre unable to learn Libra's real identity, but the villain was able to fight off the Spirit of Vengeance and drive him away.

In other media
Equinox, a character inspired by Libra, appears in Batman: The Brave and the Bold, voiced by Oded Fehr. He was an orphan raised by the Lords of Chaos and Order, who granted him godlike powers and tasked him with maintaining balance between good and evil. However, Equinox was overwhelmed by this and went rogue to pursue his own sense of balance. In the teaser for the episode "Mystery in Space!", Equinox attempts to kill Gorilla Grodd and the Question, which leads to his first encounter with Batman, who foils the plot despite Equinox escaping. In the episode "When OMAC Attacks!", Equinox manipulates Shrapnel and OMAC into fighting and causing a New York City nuclear power plant to melt down as compensation for Shrapnel's village being destroyed years prior. While Batman nearly sacrifices himself to shut down the nuclear reactor, Equinox heals him before disappearing once more. In "The Fate of Equinox!", Equinox tricks Batman into ensuring the former's ascent to godhood, intending to destroy the universe and create it anew. Despite stealing his former masters' powers and becoming Equinox-Prime, Batman distracts Equinox with the revelation that the latter is unbalanced as he hates the Lords of Chaos and Order before knocking him into the vortex Equinox created to destroy the universe. In "Time Out for Vengeance!", it is revealed Equinox's consciousness was shattered into a dozen fragments, each embodying a part of his mind, and scattered throughout space and time. His hatred landed in a computer in the far future, where it captures that time period's Batman and forms the Batman Revenge Squad to erase Batmen across the time-space continuum. However, Rip Hunter discovers this and alerts the Justice League International, who defeat the Batman Revenge Squad before confronting Equinox's hatred. It merges several robots into one giant robot that it can inhabit, but the future Batman frees himself from its control and summons three Batmen from across time to help him neutralize Equinox's hatred.

References

External links
 Libra at the DC Database Project
 
 FINAL CRISIS FLASHBACK: Libra & Human Flame, Comic Book Resources, June 5, 2008

Characters created by Dick Dillin
Characters created by Len Wein
Comics characters introduced in 1974
DC Comics aliens
DC Comics deities
DC Comics male supervillains
Fictional characters with absorption or parasitic abilities
Fictional mass murderers